Satayevo (Satay) is a rural locality (a village) in Yenebey-Ursayevsky Selsoviet, Miyakinsky District, Bashkortostan, Russia. The population was 136 as of 2010. There is 1 street.

Geography 
Satayevo is located 30 km west of Kirgiz-Miyaki (the district's administrative centre) by road. Yenebey-Ursayevo is the nearest rural locality.

References 

Rural localities in Miyakinsky District